Microcheila is a genus of beetles in the family Carabidae, containing the following species:

 Microcheila denticollis Jeannel, 1948
 Microcheila picea Brulle, 1834

References

Pterostichinae